HC Vipers Tallinn is an ice hockey team located in Tallinn, Estonia, and playing in the Coolbet Hokiliiga, the top tier of ice hockey in Estonia. They play home games at the Tondiraba Ice Hall.

History
HC Vipers were founded in 2011, and have been sporadic members of the Meistriliiga, first playing in the league during the 2017–18 season.Originally playing under the name of HC Vipers, the team changed their name to HC Vipers Tallinn in 2020.

Roster 
Updated January 15, 2021.

References

External links
 
eestihoki.ee 

Sport in Tallinn
Ice hockey teams in Estonia
Meistriliiga (ice hockey)
Ice hockey clubs established in 2011
2011 establishments in Estonia